Bulkhead is an unincorporated community in Saint Marys Township, Auglaize County, Ohio, United States.

One of the Miami and Erie Canal feeder canals is located in Bulkhead.

References

Unincorporated communities in Auglaize County, Ohio